Rosa micrantha, the small-flowered sweet briar, is a species of flowering plant in the family Rosaceae. It is native to most of Europe, the Atlas Mountains of Africa, the Caucasus region, Turkey, Lebanon, and Syria, and it has been introduced to eastern North America, Argentina, and New Zealand. A shrub reaching , it is not readily available in commerce.

References

micrantha
Flora of Morocco
Flora of Algeria
Flora of Tunisia
Flora of Great Britain
Flora of Sweden
Flora of Southwestern Europe
Flora of Central Europe
Flora of Southeastern Europe
Flora of Ukraine
Flora of the Crimean Peninsula
Flora of the Caucasus
Flora of Turkey
Flora of Syria
Flora of Lebanon
Plants described in 1813